Football for both men and women was contested in the 2017 Summer Deaflympics from July 18 to July 30.

Samsun 19 Mayis Stadium, Bafra Stadium and Carsamba Stadium were selected to host the football matches.

In the Men's category, Turkey defeated Ukraine to claim the gold medal and in the Women's category, Russia defeated Poland to claim the gold medal.

Men's tournament 
In the Men's category, 16 nations competed in 4 groups.

Group stage

Pool A

Pool B

Pool C

Pool D

Knockout stage

Elimination
<onlyinclude>

Classification

Women's tournament 
6 nations competed in one group, which was a Knockout eliminator.

Group stage

Pool A

Final results

Medalists

References

External links 
 Football
 Football pdf

2017 in association football
International association football competitions hosted by Turkey
2017 Summer Deaflympics
2017–18 in Turkish football